The 2005 Minnesota Twins Season was the franchise's 45th season playing in the Twin Cities and the 105th season in its history. The team was managed by Ron Gardenhire in his fourth year as the Twins' manager. They played their home games in the Metrodome.

The Twins' final record was 83-79. They finished third in the American League Central division, behind the Chicago White Sox and the Cleveland Indians, and they missed the playoffs.

Regular season

The Twins got off to an average start.  However, the Chicago White Sox had a fantastic start to the season. The Twins tried to stay close in the standings, but their offense was insufficient. The Twins (83-79) finished in 3rd place behind the Chicago White Sox and the Cleveland Indians, and missed the playoffs for the first time since 2001. The White Sox went on to earn the division title, their first trip to the playoffs since 2000, and their first World Series title since 1917.

Standings

Record vs. opponents

Roster

Offense
Australian Glenn Williams came up for his cup of coffee and played in thirteen games from June 7 to June 28.  He hit safely in every game, earning the Twins record for the longest hitting streak to start a career.  When he was sent back down, he took with him 17 hits and a .425 batting average.  He'd never return to the major leagues, but is working on an active 13-game hitting streak...

Joe Mauer led the team with a .294 batting average, Justin Morneau led the team in runs batted in with 79, but Mauer hit only 9 home runs and 55 RBI, while Morneau hit only .239.

These problems were endemic to the team.  No starter batted over .300 or hit over 25 home runs; however, Matthew LeCroy managed to hit 17 home runs in part-time duty.

The team's offensive struggles led to an uncertain lineup, with many defensive positions lacking regular starters.  The team experimented by bringing in Seattle Mariners infielder Bret Boone to fill the void at second base, but he lasted for only 53 at-bats, hitting .170.  The weak hitting led to hitting coach Scott Ullger being reassigned to third base coach after the season was over.

Pitching

Twins pitchers performed well in 2005.  The staff was led by All-Star Johan Santana (16-7, 2.87 ERA, 238 strikeouts) and All-Star closer Joe Nathan (43 saves, 2.70 ERA).  However, the weak hitting prevented any other starter from winning ten games.  (Jesse Crain, in a stellar year out of the bullpen, did go 12-5.)  The anemic offense also may have cost Santana a second Cy Young Award, as he finished with only sixteen victories.

The top end of the rotation—Santana, Brad Radke, Kyle Lohse, and Carlos Silva—pitched well.  Many bullpen pitchers had outstanding years, in particular Crain, Juan Rincón (2.45 ERA), J. C. Romero (3.47), and Matt Guerrier (3.39).

Silva in particular had what seemed to be a breakout year, walking only nine batters during the entire season to set a modern-era record (over 188.1 innings, a 0.43 rate).  Silva induced 34 double plays to lead the majors, and won a May 20 game throwing just 74 pitches over nine innings.  No pitcher has thrown as few pitches in a nine-inning win since 1957.

In early May, the pitching staff was shaken when Major League Baseball announced that Juan Rincón would be suspended for ten days for violating the sport's policy on performance-enhancing drugs.  Rincón pitched well both before and after this occurred.

Defense

Like his predecessor Tom Kelly, Gardenhire emphasized baseball fundamentals like defense.  Despite Hunter's injury, he still won a Gold Glove in center field.  Joe Mauer established a reputation as an outstanding defensive catcher, with a .993 fielding percentage.  Morneau, not known for his defense, surprised many with a .994 average at first.  Luis Rivas was a solid defensive second baseman, but his offensive shortcomings became too much to bear, leading the team to experiment with Boone and Nick Punto at the position.  In contrast to Rivas, Michael Cuddyer saw a majority of the time at third base. Jason Bartlett and Juan Castro split time at shortstop, with Castro being the superior defensive player. Shannon Stewart and Jacque Jones both had .985 fielding percentages in the corner outfield positions.  Lew Ford saw time at all three outfield positions.

Player stats

Batting
Note: G = Games played; AB = At bats; R = Runs; H = Hits; 2B = Doubles; 3B = Triples; HR = Home runs; RBI = Runs batted in; SB = Stolen bases; BB = Walks; AVG = Batting average; SLG = Slugging average

Source:

Pitching
Note: W = Wins; L = Losses; ERA = Earned run average; G = Games pitched; GS = Games started; SV = Saves; IP = Innings pitched; H = Hits allowed; R = Runs allowed; ER = Earned runs allowed; BB = Walks allowed; SO = Strikeouts

Source:

Notable transactions

January 3: Signed Brent Abernathy as a free agent.
January 24: Former first-round pick Adam Johnson released.
March 31: Lost Michael Restovich to the Tampa Bay Devil Rays on waivers.
June 7: Drafted pitcher Matt Garza with the 25th pick in the first round of the 2005 Amateur Draft.  Garza would make his debut the following year.
July 11: Received Bret Boone from the Seattle Mariners for future consideration.  Boone would hit .170 and was released on July 31.
October 3: Former all-star pitcher Joe Mays and Augie Ojeda granted free agency.
October 11: Matthew LeCroy, Glenn Williams, and Jason Tyner granted free agency.  Tyner would re-sign with the Twins four days later.  Williams would be re-signed on November 23.
October 12: Brent Abernathy and Luis Rivas granted free agency.
October 27: Terry Mulholland granted free agency.
October 28: Outfielder Jacque Jones granted free agency.
December 2: Traded Travis Bowyer and Scott Tyler to the Florida Marlins for second baseman Luis Castillo.
December 9: Traded pitcher J. C. Romero to the Los Angeles Angels for infielder Alexi Casilla, who would make his debut next September.
December 15: Signed Tony Batista as a free agent.
December 21: Grant Balfour granted free agency.
December 22: Rondell White signed as a free agent.
December 23: Mike Smith signed as a free agent.
December 27: Dennys Reyes signed as a free agent.

Miscellaneous

On May 15, pitcher Brad Radke walked Texas' Mark Teixeira, after a streak of 191 consecutive batters who hadn't earned a walk off Radke. 
Johan Santana finished in third in the voting for the Cy Young Award behind Mariano Rivera and the winner, Bartolo Colón.
In 2005, the Twins celebrated the 40th anniversary of their AL pennant win in 1965.
The representatives of the Twins in the All-Star Game were closer Joe Nathan and Johan Santana.
Frank Viola and Carl Pohlad were inducted into the Twins Hall of Fame.
The Twins wore the uniforms of the 1909 St. Paul Colored Gophers during a Turn Back the Clock game on July 10, 2005 in Kansas City against the Royals.

Other post-season awards
Calvin R. Griffith Award (Most Valuable Twin) – Johan Santana
Joseph W. Haynes Award (Twins Pitcher of the Year) – Johan Santana
Bill Boni Award (Twins Outstanding Rookie) – Jesse Crain
Charles O. Johnson Award (Most Improved Twin) – Carlos Silva
Dick Siebert Award (Upper Midwest Player of the Year) – Travis Hafner
Bob Allison Award (Leadership Award) – Mike Redmond
The above awards are voted on by the Twin Cities chapter of the BBWAA
Carl R. Pohlad Award (Outstanding Community Service) – Ron Gardenhire
Sherry Robertson Award (Twins Outstanding Farm System Position Player) – David Winfree
Jim Rantz Award (Twins Outstanding Farm System Pitcher) – Francisco Liriano

Farm system 

<small>LEAGUE CHAMPIONS: Elizabethton

References

External links

Player stats from www.baseball-reference.com
Team info from www.baseball-almanac.com
Twins history during the current decade, from www.mlb.com 
2005 Standings

Minnesota Twins seasons
Minnesota Twins Season, 2005
2005 in sports in Minnesota